This article lists the order of battle of RAF Coastal Command throughout the Second World War in the European Theatre of World War II.

3 September 1939
No. 15 Group RAF (GR), under command of Air Commodore R.G. Parry, DSO

No. 16 Group RAF (GR), under command of Air Commodore R.L.G. Marix, DSO

No. 17 Group RAF (T), under command of Air Commodore T.E.B. Howe, CBE, AFC

No. 18 Group RAF (GR), under command of Air Vice Marshal C.D. Breese, CB, AFC

1 November 1940
No. 15 Group RAF (GR), under command of Air Commodore R.G. Parry, DSO

No. 16 Group RAF (GR), under command of Air Vice Marshal J.H.S. Tyssen, CB, DSO

No. 17 Group RAF (T), under command of Air Commodore T.E.B. Howe, CBE, AFC

No. 18 Group RAF (GR), under command of Air Vice Marshal C.D. Breese, CB, AFC

No. 200 Group RAF (Coastal), under command of Group Captain A.D. Rogers, CBE, AFC

12 February 1942
No. 15 Group RAF (GR), under command of Air Vice Marshal J.M. Robb, CB, DSO, DFC, AFC

No. 16 Group RAF (GR), under command of Air Commodore I.T. Lloyd, CBE

No. 17 Group RAF (T), under command of Air Commodore H.G. Smart, CBE, DFC, AFC

No. 18 Group RAF (GR), under command of Air Vice Marshal A. Durston, CB, AFC

No. 19 Group RAF (GR), under command of  Air Commodore G.R. Bromet, CBE, DSO

AHQ Gibraltar, under command of Air Commodore S.P. Simpson, CBE, MC

AHQ Iceland, under command of Air Commodore W.H. Primrose, CBE, DFC

15 February 1943
No. 15 Group RAF under command of Air Vice Marshal T.A. Langford-Sainsbury, OBE, DFC, AFC

No. 16 Group RAF, under command of Air Vice Marshal B.E. Baker, CB, DSO, MC, AFC

No. 17 Group RAF, under command of Air Commodore H.G. Smart, CBE, DFC, AFC

No. 18 Group RAF, under command of Air Vice Marshal A.B. Ellwood, CB, DSC

No. 19 Group RAF, under command of Air Vice Marshal G.R. Bromet, CB, CBE, DSO

AHQ Gibraltar, under command of Air Commodore S.P. Simpson, CBE, MC

AHQ Iceland, under command of Air Commodore K.B. Lloyd, AFC

6 June 1944
No. 15 Group RAF under command of Air Vice Marshal Sir Leonard Slatter, KBE, CB, DSC, DFC

No. 16 Group RAF, under command of Air Vice Marshal F.L. Hopps, CB, CBE, AFC

No. 17 Group RAF, under command of Air Commodore H.G. Smart, CBE, DFC, AFC

No. 18 Group RAF, under command of Air Vice Marshal S.P. Simpson, CB, CBE, MC

No. 19 Group RAF, under command of Air Vice Marshal B.E. Baker, CB, DSO, MC, AFC

No. 106 Group RAF, under command of Air Commodore J.N. Boothman, CB, DFC, AFC

No. 247 Group RAF, under command of Air Vice Marshal G.R. Bromet, CB, CBE, DSO

AHQ Gibraltar, under command of Air Vice Marshal W. Elliott, CB, CBE, DFC

AHQ Iceland, under command of Air Commodore C.G. Wigglesworth, AFC

References
Footnotes

Citations

Bibliography

 Ashworth, Chris. RAF Coastal Command: 1936–1969. Patrick Stephens Ltd. 1992. 
 Blumenson, Martin & Greenfield, Ken. Command Decisions. United States Government Printing. 1984. 
 Buckley, John. The RAF and Trade Defence, 1919–1945: Constant Endeavour. Ryburn Publishing. 1995. 
 Buckley, John. Air Power in the Age of Total War. UCL Press. 1998. .
 Blair, Clay. Hitler's U-Boat War: The Hunters 1939–1942 Cassel & Co. 1996. 
 Blair, Clay. Hitler's U-Boat War: The Hunted 1942–1945. Cassel & Co. 1996. 
 Bowyer, Chaz. Coastal Command at War. Shepperton, Surrey, UK: Ian Allan Ltd., 1979. .
 Corum, James. The Luftwaffe: Creating the Operational Air War, 1918–1940. Kansas University Press. 1997. 
 de la Ferté, Philiip Joubert. The Birds and the Fishes: The Story of Coastal Command. Hutchinson. 1960. (No ISBN)
 Delve, Ken. The Source Book of the RAF. Shrewsbury, Shropshire, UK: Airlife Publishing Ltd., 1994. .
 Forczyk, Robert. Fw 200 Condor Vs Atlantic Convoys, 1941–1943. Osprey Publications. 2010. 
 Goulter, Christina. A Forgotten Offensive: Royal Air Force Coastal Command's Anti-Shipping Campaign, 1940–1945. Frank & Cass. London. 2005. .
 Hendrie, Andrew. The Cinderella Service: RAF Coastal Command 1939–1945. Pen & Sword Aviation. 2006. .
 Hyde, H. Montgomery. British Air Policy Between the Wars, 1918–1939. Heineman 1977. .
 Kostenuk S. Griffin J. RCAF Squadron Histories and Aircraft, Samuel Stevens Hakkert & Company, 1977. 
 Lake, Alan. Flying Units of the RAF: The ancestry, formation and disbandment of all flying units from 1912. Shrewsbury, Shropshire, UK: Airlife Publishing, 1999. .
 March, Daniel J. British Warplanes of World War II. Rochester, Kent, UK: Grange Books, 1998. .
 Matusiak, Wojtek. Merlin  PR Spitfires (Classic Warbirds No. 10). Wellington, New Zealand: Ventura Publications, 2007. .
 Nesbit, Roy Conyers. Coastal Command in Action, 1939–1945. Budding Books. 2000 (2nd Edition). 
 Rawlings, John D.R. Coastal, Support and Special Squadrons of the RAF and their Aircraft. London, Jane's Publishing Company Ltd., 1982. .
 Saunders, Hilary Aidan St. George and Denis Richards. Royal Air Force, 1939–1945. Volume III: The Fight is Won. Her Majesty's Stationery Office, 1975. .
 Terraine, John. Business in Great Waters: The U-Boat Wars, 1916–1945. Leo Cooper. London. 1989.

External links
 http://www.historyofwar.org/articles/weapons_PBY_catalina_US_service.html

History of the Royal Air Force during World War II
Battle of the Atlantic
North Atlantic convoys of World War II
World War II orders of battle